Sigappu Thali is a 1988 Indian Tamil-language film, starring Charan Raj, Ramki, Nishanthi and Saranya. It was released on 15 April 1988.

Plot 
Periya Thoppu Panaiyar (Jai Ganesh) is the generous and well-loved head of the village. He's raised his daughter Kalamani (Nishanthi) to be an outspoken tomboy. Periya Thoppu has a wastrel, womanizing younger brother, Chinna Thoppu (R. P. Viswam). Sadayan (Charan Raj) runs errands for the locals and lives off the generosity of the villagers. He is orphaned the son of a Devadasi and is often treated poorly because of that. Sadayan is generally kind-hearted but becomes very belligerent when he's drunk. Kalamani falls in love with Pandikaalai (Ramki) when she attends the boxing classes he teaches. Not knowing this, Periya Thoppu arranges her marriage with someone else. Chinna Thoppu uses this situation to his benefit. He gets Sadayan drunk enough to enter the ceremony and cause a ruckus to stop the engagement. When a heartbroken Periya Thoppu is alone, Chinna Thoppu murders him and makes it look like a suicide. In this way, he gains control of his brother's wealth. Pandikaalai leaves town for police training and Sadayan promises Kalamani to arrange her marriage with Pandikaalai when he returns. Keerthana (Saranya) is a well-regarded dancer that arrives in town to perform during a festival. Like Sadayan, she's the daughter of a Devadasi and bonds with him over this. She eventually falls in love with him and they marry. Chinna Thoppu is irritated as he's had his eye on Keerthana for a while. He rapes her the night of her wedding causing Keerthana to have a mental breakdown. Kalamani is the only one who knows the truth but is threatened into silence. Pandikaalai, now a police inspector, returns to the village to investigate. The film culminates when Sadayan learns the truth of what happened to his wife and plots out his vengeance.

Cast 

Charan Raj as Sadayan
Ramki as Pandikaalai
Nishanthi as Kalamani
Saranya as Keerthana
S. S. Chandran as Dance master
Jai Ganesh as Periya Thoppu Panaiyar
R. P. Viswam as Chinna Thoppu Panaiyar

Soundtrack
Soundtrack was composed by Shankar–Ganesh and lyrics written by Vairamuthu.
Odathanni - K. J. Yesudas, K. S. Chithra
Nee Than Thotta - S. Janaki
Thillalangadi - S. P. Balasubrahmanyam, S. P. Sailaja
Maadham Mummari - Malaysia Vasudevan

Reception 
The Indian Express wrote, "Acting honours go to Sharanya and Charanraj".

References

External links 
Sigapputhaali full movie at YouTube

1988 films
1980s Tamil-language films
Films scored by Shankar–Ganesh
Films directed by R. Thyagarajan (director)